All Maps Welcome is the third studio album from British singer-songwriter Tom McRae.

Track listing

All tracks written by Tom McRae.

 "For the Restless" – 4:06
 "Hummingbird Song" – 4:45
 "The Girl Who Falls Downstairs" – 5:03
 "How the West Was Won" – 6:16
 "Packing for the Crash" – 3:49
 "It Ain't You" – 4:07
 "Strangest Land" – 3:27
 "My Vampire Heart" – 3:13
 "Silent Boulevard" – 5:04
 "Still Lost" – 3:48
 "Border Song" – 4:50

References

2005 albums
Tom McRae albums
Albums produced by Joe Chiccarelli